The 2014 Italian Open (also known as the 2014 Rome Masters and sponsored title 2014 Internazionali BNL d'Italia) was a tennis tournament played on outdoor clay courts at the Foro Italico in Rome, Italy. It was the 71st edition of the Italian Open and was classified as an ATP World Tour Masters 1000 event on the 2014 ATP World Tour and a Premier 5 event on the 2014 WTA Tour. It took place from 11 to 18 May 2014.

Points and prize money

Point distribution

Prize money

ATP main draw entrants

Singles

Seeds

 Rankings are as of May 5, 2014.

Other entrants
The following players received wildcards into the main draw:
  Simone Bolelli
  Marco Cecchinato
  Paolo Lorenzi
  Filippo Volandri

The following player received entry using a protected ranking into the main draw:
  Jürgen Melzer

The following players received entry from the qualifying draw:
  Pablo Carreño Busta
  Santiago Giraldo
  Andrey Golubev
  Alejandro González
  Pere Riba
  Stéphane Robert
  Stefano Travaglia

The following player received entry as a lucky loser:
  Alejandro Falla

Withdrawals
Before the tournament
  Nicolás Almagro → replaced by  Mikhail Kukushkin
  Juan Martín del Potro (wrist injury) → replaced by  Roberto Bautista Agut
  Richard Gasquet → replaced by  Robin Haase
  Florian Mayer → replaced by  Jérémy Chardy
  Gaël Monfils → replaced by  Igor Sijsling
  Kei Nishikori → replaced by  Alejandro Falla
  Benoît Paire → replaced by  Radek Štěpánek

Retirements
  Alejandro Falla (right foot pain)
  Santiago Giraldo (abductor strain)
  Andrey Golubev (hip flexor strain)
  Tommy Haas

Doubles

Seeds

 Rankings are as of May 5, 2014.

Other entrants
The following pairs received wildcards into the doubles main draw:
  Daniele Bracciali /  Potito Starace
  Marco Cecchinato /  Andreas Seppi

Withdrawals
During the tournament
  Tommy Haas

WTA main draw entrants

Singles

Seeds

 Rankings are as of May 5, 2014.

Other entrants
The following players received wildcards into the main draw:
  Nastassja Burnett
  Camila Giorgi
  Karin Knapp

The following player received entry using a protected ranking into the main draw:
  Romina Oprandi

The following players received entry from the qualifying draw:
  Mona Barthel
  Belinda Bencic
  Petra Cetkovská
  Lauren Davis
  Casey Dellacqua
  Christina McHale
  Monica Puig
  Chanelle Scheepers

The following player received entry as a lucky loser:
  Paula Ormaechea

Withdrawals
Before the tournament
  Victoria Azarenka (left foot injury) → replaced by  Varvara Lepchenko
  Kaia Kanepi (right heel injury) → replaced by  Peng Shuai
  Caroline Wozniacki (left knee injury) → replaced by  Paula Ormaechea

During the tournament
  Simona Halep (left abdominal injury)

Retirements
  Svetlana Kuznetsova (left hip injury)

Doubles

Seeds

 Rankings are as of May 5, 2014.

Other entrants
The following pairs received wildcards into the doubles main draw:
  Gioia Barbieri /  Nastassja Burnett
  Camila Giorgi /  Karin Knapp
  Jelena Janković /  Alisa Kleybanova

Withdrawals
During the tournament
  Zhang Shuai (shoulder injury)

Retirements
  Sara Errani (left hip injury)

Champions

Men's singles

 Novak Djokovic def.  Rafael Nadal, 4–6, 6–3, 6–3

Women's singles

 Serena Williams def.  Sara Errani, 6–3, 6–0

Men's doubles

 Daniel Nestor /  Nenad Zimonjić def.  Robin Haase /  Feliciano López, 6–4, 7–6(7–2)

Women's doubles

 Květa Peschke /  Katarina Srebotnik def.  Sara Errani /  Roberta Vinci, 4–0, ret.

References

External links
Official website

 
Italian Open
Italian Open
2014 Italian Open (Tennis)
Tennis